Kris Murray (born August 19, 2000) is an American college basketball player for the Iowa Hawkeyes of the Big Ten Conference.

Early life and high school
Murray grew up in Cedar Rapids, Iowa and attended Prairie High School, where he played basketball with his twin brother Keegan as a teammate. He was named first team All-Metro and second team All-State after averaging 19.5 points, 6.4 rebounds, 2.1 assists, 2.5 blocks, and 1.1 steals per game. Following graduation, Murray and his brother enrolled at DME Academy in Daytona Beach, Florida for a postgraduate year. Both brothers committed to play college basketball at Iowa.

College career
Murray played in 13 games, all off the bench, and 41 total minutes as a freshman for the Iowa Hawkeyes. As a sophomore, he averaged 9.7 points and 4.3 rebounds over 35 games with one start. Following the end of the season, Murray entered the 2022 NBA Draft after his brother had already done so. He ultimately withdrew his name from the draft shortly after declining an invitation to the NBA Draft Combine.

Murray entered his junior season at Iowa on the watchlists for the Karl Malone Award and the John R. Wooden Award.

Personal
Murray's father, Kenyon Murray, was a 4-year starter for the Iowa Hawkeyes from 1992-1996, and was high school Mr. Basketball in Michigan in 1992. Kris's twin brother Keegan currently plays in the NBA for the Sacramento Kings.

References

External links
Iowa Hawkeyes bio

2000 births
Living people
All-American college men's basketball players
American men's basketball players
Basketball players from Iowa
Iowa Hawkeyes men's basketball players
Power forwards (basketball)
Sportspeople from Cedar Rapids, Iowa
Twin sportspeople